Cristóbal Mauricio Silva Ibaceta (born October 12, 1979 in Santiago) is a Chilean amateur mountain biker. He has won five Chilean national championship titles in men's mountain biking, and also represented his nation Chile in two editions of the Olympic Games (2004 and 2008).

Silva spotted officially on his major international debut at the 2004 Summer Olympics in Athens, where he scored a fortieth place in the men's cross-country race with only a single lap left to complete.

At the 2008 Summer Olympics in Beijing, Silva qualified for his second Chilean squad in the men's cross-country race by receiving an automatic berth from the Chilean Cycling Federation and the Union Cycliste Internationale (UCI), based on his best performance at the World and Pan American Championships and at the Mountain Biking World Series. Silva could not upgrade again a complete cross-country distance from his ride in Athens, as he ended his course with only two laps to go and a thirty-sixth-place finish.

References

External links
NBC 2008 Olympics profile

1979 births
Living people
Chilean male cyclists
Cross-country mountain bikers
Cyclists at the 2004 Summer Olympics
Cyclists at the 2008 Summer Olympics
Olympic cyclists of Chile
Sportspeople from Santiago
20th-century Chilean people
21st-century Chilean people